The Waterfront Alliance or Metropolitan Waterfront Alliance (MWA) is a nonprofit organization that works to influence the development and use of the waterfront, shoreline, and connected upland areas of the Port of New York and New Jersey in northern New Jersey and New York City as well as other areas of the New York–New Jersey Harbor Estuary.

History
The Waterfront Alliance was founded by the Municipal Art Society in 2000, led by urban planner and activist Carter Craft. Efforts to improve ferry service and establish an industrial heritage trail along the East River were initiated by Craft.

In 2007, the Waterfront Alliance emerged as a separate nonprofit organization from the Municipal Art Society, becoming independent under the leadership of Roland Lewis. He was previously the executive director of the New York City Habitat for Humanity.

Recent Projects
Since 2006, the Waterfront Alliance has worked with the New York Harbor School under the Harbor Camp program to provide an educational summer camp opportunity for low-income children.

In June 2007 the Waterfront Alliance and the Municipal Art Society released the documentary, City of Water, about the future of New York City waterfront.

The Waterfront Alliance is a partnership of nonprofit and community groups.  Alliance partners and members are non-governmental organizations.

During 2008 the Waterfront Alliance, policy makers, activists, planners, and agency representatives developed an agenda of policy changes and projects for the waterfront. The Waterfront Action Agenda was released in November 2008 at the MWA’s Waterfront Conference.

Also in 2008, Waterfront Alliance helped to simplify the permitting process for waterfront projects in the NY-NJ Harbor by creating a Waterfront Permitting Made Simple website.

During 2009, the Waterfront Alliance worked to pass legislation to reinstate the Waterfront Management Advisory Board.

In 2009 and 2010, the Waterfront Alliance worked with the City of New York to develop and execute a public input process for the update of the Comprehensive Waterfront Plan. MWA initially had worked with the New York City Council to pass legislation requiring the update of the 1992 Comprehensive Waterfront Plan, announced by City Council Speaker Christine Quinn at the Waterfront Alliance's 2008 City of Water Day. The Plan was released by the NYC Department of City Planning in 2011 as Mayor Bloomberg’s Vision 2020: New York City Comprehensive Waterfront Plan.

In 2010, Waterfront Alliance joined with the National Parks Conservation Association (NPCA) to create the New York-New Jersey Harbor Coalition.  This bi-state coalition of nonprofit organizations is an advocacy campaign to help secure the federal and state funding needed to transform the NY-NJ Harbor to meet the environmental, recreational, and economic needs of the region’s 22 million residents. In addition to the Waterfront Alliance and the NPCA, the current Coalition members include: The Environmental Defense Fund, Hudson River Foundation, Ironbound Community Corporation, NY/NJ Baykeeper, NYC Environmental Justice Alliance, Regional Plan Association, Trust for Public Land and WE ACT. The group received support from U.S. Representatives Paul Tonko, Jerrold Nadler, Carolyn Maloney and Nydia Velazquez at MWA’s Waterfront Conference Floating Follow-Up in 2011.

The Waterfront Alliance began the Open Waters Initiative in 2010 as a program to construct community docks at waterfront sites in New York City.  The first dock will be constructed in Bay Ridge, Brooklyn in 2012.

The Waterfront Alliance organizes 6 task forces to discuss and deliberate waterfront policy, they include: Aquatecture, Water Mass Transit, Green Harbor, Harbor Education, Harbor Recreation and the Working Waterfront.

Annual Events

The Waterfront Alliance's Waterfront Conference is a platform to address current waterfront issues including environmental concerns, climate change, equity and access and financing.

City of Water Day focuses wide-scale public attention on the challenges and opportunities facing the waterfront and the event also highlights solutions.  In 2011, 25,000 people participated in the event.

President and CEO, Chairman
Roland Lewis is an American urbanist and community organizer. He was the President and CEO of the Waterfront Alliance in New York, New York until 2020. He was formerly the Executive Director of Habitat for Humanity NYC. Previously, he was a partner in the law firm of Dellapa, Lewis, and Perseo. Christopher O. Ward serves as the Chairman.

Lewis serves on the board of the New York Foundation, and is Co-Chair of the Harbor Estuary Program Citizens Advisory Committee. He also serves on the Freight and Maritime Advisory Board of the Center for Advanced Infrastructure & Transportation at Rutgers University, the Professional Advisory Committee for the New York Harbor School, Hudson River Park Trust Advisory Council and the New York City Waterfront Management Advisory Board.New York City Council Resolution

In 2012, Lewis was the chairperson of the 4th Annual Urban Waterfronts Conference in Abu Dhabi, UAE. His op-eds regarding the state of the New York-New Jersey waterfront and housing have appeared in the New York Times, Crains New York Business, Newsday New York City and Brooklyn Heights Press.

Christopher O. Ward has served as Chairman since 2016.

References

Organizations based in New York City
Waterfront redevelopment organizations
Port of New York and New Jersey